Little Tickles is a 2018 French drama film directed by Andréa Bescond and Eric Métayer. It was screened in the Un Certain Regard section at the 2018 Cannes Film Festival.

Cast
 Andréa Bescond : Odette Le Nadant
 Karin Viard : Mado Le Nadant
 Clovis Cornillac : Fabrice Le Nadant
 Pierre Deladonchamps : Gilbert Miguié
 Grégory Montel : Lenny
 Carole Franck : The psy
 Gringe : Manu
 Ariane Ascaride : Madame Malec
 Alexis Michalik : Sonia's father

References

External links
 

2018 films
2018 drama films
French drama films
2010s French-language films
2010s French films